Qualification for the 2017 Little League World Series took place in eight United States regions and eight international regions from June through August 2017.

United States

Great Lakes
The tournament took place in Westfield, Indiana August 6–12.

Mid-Atlantic
The tournament took place in Bristol, Connecticut August 6–12.

Midwest
The tournament took place in Westfield, Indiana August 6–12.

Note: North Dakota and South Dakota are organized into a single Little League district.

New England
The tournament took place in Bristol, Connecticut August 6–12.

Northwest
The tournament took place in San Bernardino, California August 6–12.

Southeast
The tournament took place in Warner Robins, Georgia August 4–9.

Southwest
The tournament took place in Waco, Texas August 3–9.

West
The tournament took place in San Bernardino, California August 6–12.

International

Asia-Pacific and Middle East
The tournament took place in South Korea July 1–7.

1 Republic of China, commonly known as Taiwan, due to complicated relations with People's Republic of China, is recognized by the name Chinese Taipei by majority of international organizations including Little League Baseball (LLB). For more information, please see Cross-Strait relations.

Australia
The tournament began in Lismore, New South Wales on June 7. The top two teams in each pool advanced to the elimination round. Following pool play, the elimination round was scheduled to begin on June 10, however due to constant inclement weather conditions, the Australian Baseball Federation announced on June 12 that the remainder of the tournament was postponed until officials could determine a resolution. It was decided that the tournament would be completed on July 8 and July 9 in Sydney.

Canada
The tournament took place in Medicine Hat, Alberta August 3–12.

Caribbean
The tournament took place in St. John's, Antigua and Barbuda July 8–13.

Europe and Africa
The tournament took place in Kutno, Poland July 17–25.

Japan
The tournament took place in Tokyo July 21–23.

Latin America
The tournament took place in Barranquilla, Colombia July 15–22.

Mexico
The tournament took place in Sabinas, Coahuila July 15–21.

References

qualification
2017 in baseball